The Crime Doctor's Strangest Case is a 1943 American mystery film directed by Eugene Forde and starring Warner Baxter, Lynn Merrick and Gloria Dickson. It is the second in a series of Crime Doctor films made by Columbia Pictures.

Plot

Cast
 Warner Baxter as Dr. Robert Ordway  
 Lynn Merrick as Ellen Trotter  
 Gloria Dickson as Mrs. Keppler / Evelyn Fenton Cartwright 
 Barton MacLane as Detective Rief 
 Jerome Cowan as Mallory Cartwright  
 Reginald Denny as Paul Ashley  
 Rose Hobart as Mrs. Diana Burns  
 Virginia Brissac as Patricia Cornwall  
 Lloyd Bridges as Jimmy Trotter  
 Constance Worth as Betty Watson 
 Sam Flint as Addison Burns  
 Creighton Hale as Dr. Carter  
 Thomas E. Jackson as Detective Yarnell 
 George Lynn as Walter Burns 
 Ray Walker as Mr. George H. Fenton

References

Bibliography
 Erickson, Hal. From Radio to the Big Screen: Hollywood Films Featuring Broadcast Personalities and Programs. McFarland, 2014.

External links
 
 
 
 

1943 films
1943 mystery films
1940s English-language films
American mystery films
Films directed by Eugene Forde
Films scored by Michel Michelet
Columbia Pictures films
American black-and-white films
Crime Doctor (character) films
1940s American films